Anders Weiss (born November 5, 1992) is an American rower. He competed in the men's coxless pair event at the 2016 Summer Olympics.

In 2018 he was selected in the number four seat of the Oxford boat at the 2018 Boat Race while studying at St Hugh's. Cambridge won the race. In June 2021, he qualified to represent the United States at the 2020 Summer Olympics.

References

External links
 

1992 births
Living people
American male rowers
Olympic rowers of the United States
Rowers at the 2016 Summer Olympics
Rowers at the 2020 Summer Olympics
Place of birth missing (living people)
Sportspeople from Providence, Rhode Island
Alumni of Saïd Business School
21st-century American people